The 1982–83 NCAA Division II men's ice hockey season began in November 1981 and concluded on March 20 of the following year. This was the 19th season of second-tier college ice hockey.

After the 1981–82 season the majority of teams that registered as NAIA programs switched to NCAA. This meant that the representation at the Division II championship, specifically from western schools, was more equitable than in years past.

Regular season

Season tournaments

Standings

1983 NCAA Tournament

Note: * denotes overtime period(s)

See also
 1982–83 NCAA Division I men's ice hockey season
 1982–83 NCAA Division III men's ice hockey season

References

External links

 
NCAA